Biodegradable Packaging for Environment Public Co. Ltd., (BPE) is a Thai company. It manufactures biodegradable, compostable, therefore disposable tableware products. The products primarily are made from bagasse, a natural product made from the pulp of sugar cane after the sugar has been extracted. From its founding in 2005 until 2012 BPE branded its products as "Biochanaoy". In 2012 it renamed its brand, "Gracz".

History 
BPE was founded in January 2005 by Dr Weerachat Kittirattanapaiboon, MD. Company headquarters is in Bangkok with its industrial facilities in Chai Nat Province, approximately 188 km north of Bangkok. Major shareholders are the MDS Group, the National Innovation Agency of the Ministry of Science and Technology, and the Office of Small and Medium Enterprises Promotion (OSMEP) of the Ministry of Industry.

Products
BPE manufactures two lines of take-out food containers and one line of non-food industrial packaging containers.

 Gracz Classic: A family of over 50 tableware items ranging from cups, bowls, plates, and clamshell containers to cutlery. The items, white in color, are made from bagasse exclusively. 
 Gracz Simple: A family of tableware items, cream colored, made from bagasse and bamboo.
 Non-food containers: BPE manufactures industrial packaging products.

Operations
The company currently has over 400 employees and hopes to double production to five million pieces per day in 2017. BPE earns 70 percent of its total annual revenue from exports to developed countries. In 2017 it affirmed its intention to penetrate its home market of Thailand and the other nine ASEAN nations under the GracZ label. It also sells private label goods to brands such as Studio, Walmart, and Lidl Stiftung & Co.

Environmental concerns 
The firm is the only company in Thailand to be awarded the Thailand Board of Investment (BOI) Privilege in the environmental category. The factory energy runs completely on LPG and steam, and all wastes from the production process are recycled. Bagasse is a natural product, Biodegradable in 45 days in a landfill or in nature. Bagasse products can be frozen, can go to an oven, and are microwavable. The company's products are UV pasteurized, and are  safe for food contact.

Awards 
BPE received several awards: Demark Award, Good Design Award, and the Certificate of Material Excellence.

References 

Packaging companies of Thailand
Manufacturing companies based in Bangkok
Renewable resource companies established in 2005
Thai companies established in 2005